Scotasay is small island in the Outer Hebrides of Scotland. There are two houses on the island, a wind turbine and a fresh water tank.

The island had 15-20 inhabitants in the early 20th century but there are no records of any permanent inhabitation since then.

References

Islands off Lewis and Harris
Harris, Outer Hebrides
Uninhabited islands of the Outer Hebrides